Abid Mohammadi (born 31 December 2002) is an Afghan cricketer. He made his first-class debut for Kabul Region in the 2019 Ahmad Shah Abdali 4-day Tournament on 22 April 2019. He made his List A debut for Nangarhar Province in the 2019 Afghanistan Provincial Challenge Cup tournament on 31 July 2019.

In December 2019, he was named in Afghanistan's squad for the 2020 Under-19 Cricket World Cup.

References

External links
 

2002 births
Living people
Afghan cricketers
Kabul Eagles cricketers
Place of birth missing (living people)